The flag of the state of Rhode Island is white and consists of a gold anchor in the center  (a symbol for hope) surrounded by thirteen gold stars (for the original Thirteen Colonies and Rhode Island's status as the 13th state to ratify the Constitution). A blue ribbon below the anchor bears the state's motto in gold: "HOPE". The flag is frequently depicted with golden fringe around the edges of the flag, although the fringe is never actually on the flag unless it is used in federal-level displays, much like the national flag.

History

The present flag of the state of Rhode Island was formally adopted in 1897. As early as the 1640s, the anchor and "hope" were found on the Rhode Island Seal, and the seal's words and emblems were likely inspired by the biblical phrase "hope we have as an anchor of the soul," found in Hebrews, Verse 6:18-19. Rhode Island's earliest colonists were fleeing persecution in Massachusetts due to their religious beliefs.

Statute
The state of Rhode Island enacted legislation making this the official flag:
§ 42-4-3  State flag. – The flag of the state shall be white, five feet and six inches (5'6") fly and four feet and ten inches (4'10") deep on the pike, bearing on each side in the center a gold anchor, twenty-two inches (22") high, and underneath it a blue ribbon twenty-four inches (24") long and five inches (5") wide, or in these proportions, with the motto "Hope" in golden letters thereon, the whole surrounded by thirteen (13) golden stars in a circle. The flag shall be edged with yellow fringe. The pike shall be surmounted by a spearhead and the length of the pike shall be nine feet (9'), not including the spearhead.

Gallery

Other Flags

Another commonly flown flag is the flag of the Rhode Island Regiment.  Many houses throughout the state display the flag alongside the current flag, or in lieu of the state flag. The flag can also be seen flying at home football games of the University of Rhode Island Rams.

Flag of the Governor 

The flag of the Governor of Rhode Island is based on an earlier state flag. Like most U.S. governors' flags, there are four five-point stars at the corners of the field.

See also

State of Rhode Island
Symbols of Rhode Island
Seal of the State of Rhode Island

References

External links
 Rhode Island State Laws: § 42-4-3 State flag
 Flags of the world Rhode Island page

United States state flags
Flag
Flag
Flags introduced in 1897
1897 establishments in Rhode Island